Khe Bong Constituency was a constituency in Singapore. It existed from 1976 to 1988 and was absorbed into Toa Payoh Group Representation Constituency. It absorbed part of Kuo Chuan & Toa Payoh constituencies.

Member of Parliament

Elections

Elections in the 1970s

Elections in 1980s

References

Singaporean electoral divisions
Toa Payoh